Marc Oberweis (born 6 November 1982) is a retired Luxembourgian footballer who last played as a goalkeeper for Jeunesse Esch in Luxembourg's domestic National Division.

Club career
Oberweis came through the youth ranks at F91 Dudelange where he made his senior debut in 2002. In 2004, he joined Grevenmacher.

International career
Oberweis made his debut for Luxembourg in a March 2005 World Cup qualification match against Latvia, taking the national team jersey over from Alija Besic. He went on to earn 7 caps, 5 of them FIFA World Cup qualification matches.

He also played several Euro League and Champions League Qualification games for his clubs Jeunesse Esch, CS Grevenmacher and F91 Dudelange.

Honours
Luxembourg Cup: 2
 2004, 2008

National Champion 2010 with Jeunesse Esch
Elected 3 times best Goalkeeper in BGL Ligue
2nd best player in BGL Ligue in the season 09–10.

References

External links
 Player profile - CS Grevenmacher
 

1982 births
Living people
Sportspeople from Luxembourg City
Luxembourgian footballers
F91 Dudelange players
CS Grevenmacher players
Luxembourg international footballers
Association football goalkeepers